Martin Hamilton may refer to:

 Martin D. Hamilton (American politician)
 Martin Hamilton-Smith (Australian politician)
 Martin Hamilton House (Historic house in West Virginia, United States)